Cherry Red is an album by the American saxophonist/vocalist Eddie "Cleanhead" Vinson recorded in New York in 1967, and released by the BluesWay label.

Track listing
All compositions by Eddie "Cleanhead" Vinson and Louis Zito except where noted
 "Cherry Red" (Pete Johnson, Big Joe Turner) − 3:09
 "Cadillac Blues" (George David Weiss, George Douglas) − 2:59
 "Juice Head Baby" − 3:08
 "Alimony Blues" − 3:27
 "Somebody's Gotta Go" (Big Bill Broonzy) − 3:03
 "Flat Broke Blues" (Weiss, Douglas) − 2:26
 "Old Maid Got Married" (Vinson, Milt Larkin, D. Timberlake) − 2:43
 "Workin' Blues" (Duke Ellington, Don George) − 2:50
 "Wee Baby Blues" (Johnson, Turner) − 3:00
 "Goodnight Baby Blues" − 5:02

Personnel
Eddie "Cleanhead" Vinson − alto saxophone, vocals
Buddy Lucas − tenor saxophone, harmonica
Mike Bloomfield − guitar
Patti Bown − piano, organ
Unidentified musicians − guitar, bass, drums

References

BluesWay Records albums
1967 albums
Eddie Vinson albums
Albums produced by Bob Thiele